These 384 species belong to Cryptocephalus, a genus of case-bearing leaf beetles in the family Chrysomelidae.

Cryptocephalus species
A partial list of species include:

 Cryptocephalus abdominalis
 Cryptocephalus abhorens Suffrian, 1866 g
 Cryptocephalus acupunctatus
 Cryptocephalus albicans Haldeman, 1849 i c g b
 Cryptocephalus albolineatus Suffrian, 1847 g
 Cryptocephalus alnicola A.Costa, 1884 g
 Cryptocephalus alternans Suffrian, 1852 i c g b
 Cryptocephalus amasiensis
 Cryptocephalus amatus Haldeman, 1849 i c g b
 Cryptocephalus andrewsi E. Riley & Gilbert, 2000 i c g b
 Cryptocephalus androgyne Marseul, 1875 g
 Cryptocephalus angorensis
 Cryptocephalus anticus Suffrian, 1848 g
 Cryptocephalus apicalis
 Cryptocephalus aquitanus Sassi, 2001 g
 Cryptocephalus araxidis
 Cryptocephalus areolatus Suffrian, 1852
 Cryptocephalus arizonensis Schaeffer, 1904 i c g b  (blue-winged cryptocephalus)
 Cryptocephalus astracanicus
 Cryptocephalus astralosus White, 1968
 Cryptocephalus asturiensis Heyden, 1870 g
 Cryptocephalus atrifrons Abeille de Perrin, 1901 g
 Cryptocephalus atriplicis
 Cryptocephalus atrofasciatus Jacoby, 1880 i c g b
 Cryptocephalus augustalisi
 Cryptocephalus aulicus Haldeman, 1849 i c g b
 Cryptocephalus aureolus Suffrian, 1847 g
 Cryptocephalus australobispinus E. Riley & Gilbert, 2000 i c g b
 Cryptocephalus ayvazi
 Cryptocephalus azurescens Escalera, 1914 g
 Cryptocephalus baborensis
 Cryptocephalus badius Suffrian, 1852 i c g b
 Cryptocephalus baeticus
 Cryptocephalus bahilloi José Ignacio López Colón, 2003
 Cryptocephalus bailundensis Weise
 Cryptocephalus bameuli Duhaldeborde, 1999 g
 Cryptocephalus barii
 Cryptocephalus basalis Suffrian, 1852 i c g b
 Cryptocephalus bicolor Eschscholtz, 1818 g
 Cryptocephalus bidorsalis
 Cryptocephalus biguttatus (Scopoli, 1763) g
 Cryptocephalus biledjekensis
 Cryptocephalus bilineatus (Linnaeus, 1767) g
 Cryptocephalus bimaculatus
 Cryptocephalus binominis Newman, 1841 i c g b
 Cryptocephalus binotatus White, 1968
 Cryptocephalus biondii Sassi & Regalin, 1998 g
 Cryptocephalus bipunctatus
 Cryptocephalus bispinus Suffrian, 1858 i c g b
 Cryptocephalus bivius Newman, 1840 i c g b
 Cryptocephalus blanduloides Normand, 1947 g
 Cryptocephalus bohemius
 Cryptocephalus borowieci
 Cryptocephalus brevisignaticollis
 Cryptocephalus brunneovittatus Schaeffer, 1904 i c g b
 Cryptocephalus brunneus Suffrian, 1863 g
 Cryptocephalus caerulescens Sahlberg, 1838 g
 Cryptocephalus calidus Suffrian, 1852 i c g b
 Cryptocephalus cantabricus
 Cryptocephalus carinthiacus Suffrian, 1848 g
 Cryptocephalus carpathicus
 Cryptocephalus castaneus Leconte, 1880
 Cryptocephalus castilianus
 Cryptocephalus celtibericus Suffrian, 1848 g
 Cryptocephalus cerinus White, 1937
 Cryptocephalus chinensis Jacoby, 1888 g
 Cryptocephalus chrysopus Gmelin, 1790 g
 Cryptocephalus cicatricosus
 Cryptocephalus cognatus A.Costa, 1886 g
 Cryptocephalus concolor
 Cryptocephalus confluentus Say, 1824 i c g b
 Cryptocephalus connexus Olivier, 1807 g
 Cryptocephalus contextus White, 1968
 Cryptocephalus convergens Sassi, 2001 g
 Cryptocephalus cordiger (Linnaeus, 1758) g
 Cryptocephalus coronatus
 Cryptocephalus coryli (Linnaeus, 1758) g
 Cryptocephalus corynetes
 Cryptocephalus cowaniae Schaeffer, 1934 i c g
 Cryptocephalus crassus Olivier, 1791 g
 Cryptocephalus crenatus Wollaston, 1854 g
 Cryptocephalus creticus
 Cryptocephalus cribratus
 Cryptocephalus cribripennis Leconte, 1880
 Cryptocephalus cristula Dufour, 1843 g
 Cryptocephalus cruciger Hellén, 1922 g
 Cryptocephalus cuneatus Fall, 1932 i c g b
 Cryptocephalus cupressi Schaeffer, 1933 i c g b
 Cryptocephalus curda
 Cryptocephalus curvilinea Olivier, 1808 g
 Cryptocephalus cyanipes Suffrian, 1847 g
 Cryptocephalus cynarae Suffrian, 1847 g
 Cryptocephalus czwalinae
 Cryptocephalus daccordii
 Cryptocephalus dahdah
 Cryptocephalus danieli Clavareau, 1913 g
 Cryptocephalus decemmaculatus (Linnaeus, 1758) g
 Cryptocephalus defectus Leconte, 1880
 Cryptocephalus dinae
 Cryptocephalus discicollis
 Cryptocephalus discoidalis Jacoby, 1890 g
 Cryptocephalus disruptus White, 1968
 Cryptocephalus distinctenotatus
 Cryptocephalus distinguendus Schneider, 1792 g
 Cryptocephalus dogueti
 Cryptocephalus dorsatus White, 1968
 Cryptocephalus downiei E. Riley & Gilbert, 2000 i c g b  (Downie's spotted leaf beetle)
 Cryptocephalus dumonti
 Cryptocephalus duplicatus
 Cryptocephalus duryi Schaeffer, 1906 i c g b
 Cryptocephalus egregius Schaeffer, 1933
 Cryptocephalus elatus
 Cryptocephalus elegantulus Gravenhorst, 1807 g
 Cryptocephalus elongatus Germar, 1824 g
 Cryptocephalus emiliae
 Cryptocephalus equiseti A.Costa, 1886 g
 Cryptocephalus ergenensis
 Cryptocephalus eridani Sassi, 2001 g
 Cryptocephalus espanoli
 Cryptocephalus etruscus Suffrian, 1847 g
 Cryptocephalus euchirus
 Cryptocephalus excisus
 Cryptocephalus exiguus Schneider, 1792 g
 Cryptocephalus falli Schöller, 2002 i c g b
 Cryptocephalus falzonii
 Cryptocephalus fasciatus Say, 1824
 Cryptocephalus fausti
 Cryptocephalus festivus Jacoby, 1890 g
 Cryptocephalus flavicollis
 Cryptocephalus flavipes Fabricius, 1781 g
 Cryptocephalus flexuosus
 Cryptocephalus floralis
 Cryptocephalus floribundus Suffrian, 1866 g
 Cryptocephalus formosanus Chujo, 1934 g
 Cryptocephalus freidbergi
 Cryptocephalus frenatus Laicharting, 1781 g
 Cryptocephalus frontalis Marsham, 1802 g
 Cryptocephalus fulgurans
 Cryptocephalus fulguratus Leconte, 1880
 Cryptocephalus fulvus (Goeze, 1777) g
 Cryptocephalus gamma
 Cryptocephalus gibbicollis Haldeman, 1849 i c g b
 Cryptocephalus globicollis Suffrian, 1847 g
 Cryptocephalus gloriosus
 Cryptocephalus grammicus Suffrian, 1852 g
 Cryptocephalus gridellii
 Cryptocephalus guadeloupensis Fleutiaux & Sallé, 1889 g
 Cryptocephalus guttulatellus Schaeffer, 1920 i c g b
 Cryptocephalus guttulatus Olivier, 1808 i c g b  (fourteen-spotted leaf beetle)
 Cryptocephalus guyanensis Jacoby, 1907 g
 Cryptocephalus halleri Costessèque, 2008 g
 Cryptocephalus hamifasciatus Chujo, 1934 g
 Cryptocephalus heinigi
 Cryptocephalus hiro Chujo, 1954 g
 Cryptocephalus hohuanshanus Kimoto, 1996 g
 Cryptocephalus hypochaeridis (Linnaeus, 1758) g
 Cryptocephalus hypochoeridis (Linnaeus, 1758) g
 Cryptocephalus ilicis
 Cryptocephalus illyricus
 Cryptocephalus imperialis Laicharting, 1781 g
 Cryptocephalus implacidus White, 1968
 Cryptocephalus incertus Olivier, 1808 i c g b
 Cryptocephalus indecoratus Stal, 1857 g
 Cryptocephalus infirmior Kraatz, 1876 g
 Cryptocephalus informis Suffrian, 1847 g
 Cryptocephalus ingamma
 Cryptocephalus insertus Haldeman, 1849 i c g b
 Cryptocephalus irroratus Suffrian, 1852 i c g b
 Cryptocephalus janthinus Germar, 1824 g
 Cryptocephalus jocularius
 Cryptocephalus kanoi Chujo, 1954 g
 Cryptocephalus katranus
 Cryptocephalus kiyoyamai Kimoto, 1974 g
 Cryptocephalus krugi Weise, 1885 g
 Cryptocephalus labiatus (Linnaeus, 1761) g
 Cryptocephalus laetus
 Cryptocephalus laevicollis
 Cryptocephalus lateralis
 Cryptocephalus lateritius Newman, 1841 i c g b
 Cryptocephalus laticornis Suffrian, 1863 g
 Cryptocephalus lederi
 Cryptocephalus lefevrei 
 Cryptocephalus leonhardi
 Cryptocephalus leucomelas Suffrian, 1852 i c g b
 Cryptocephalus limbifer
 Cryptocephalus limoniastri
 Cryptocephalus lineellus Suffrian, 1849 g
 Cryptocephalus literatifer
 Cryptocephalus lividimanus
 Cryptocephalus loebli
 Cryptocephalus loreyi Solier, 1837 g
 Cryptocephalus lostiai
 Cryptocephalus lostianus Burlini, 1956 g
 Cryptocephalus lunatus White, 1968
 Cryptocephalus lunulatus Schöller, 2002 i c g
 Cryptocephalus luridicollis Suffrian, 1868 g
 Cryptocephalus lusitanicus
 Cryptocephalus luteolus Newman, 1840 i c g b
 Cryptocephalus luteosignatus Pic, 1922 g
 Cryptocephalus maccus White, 1968
 Cryptocephalus macellus Suffrian, 1860 g
 Cryptocephalus majoricensis
 Cryptocephalus makii Chujo, 1934 g
 Cryptocephalus marginatus Fabricius, 1781 g
 Cryptocephalus marginellus Olivier, 1791 g
 Cryptocephalus mariae Mulsant & Rey, 1852 g
 Cryptocephalus mayeti Marseul, 1878 g
 Cryptocephalus merus Fall, 1932 i c g b
 Cryptocephalus mitchyi Chujo, 1954 g
 Cryptocephalus modestus
 Cryptocephalus moehringi
 Cryptocephalus monticola
 Cryptocephalus moraei (Linnaeus, 1758) g
 Cryptocephalus moroderi Pic, 1914 g
 Cryptocephalus moutoni Pic, 1922 g
 Cryptocephalus moya Chujo, 1954 g
 Cryptocephalus mucoreus Leconte, 1859
 Cryptocephalus muellerianus
 Cryptocephalus multisignatus Schaeffer, 1933 i c g b
 Cryptocephalus mutabilis Melsheimer, 1847
 Cryptocephalus mystacatus
 Cryptocephalus nanus Fabricius, 1801 i c g b
 Cryptocephalus nigellus
 Cryptocephalus nigrocinctus Suffrian, 1852 i c g b
 Cryptocephalus nigronotaticollis Chujo, 1934 g
 Cryptocephalus nigroplagiatus Fairmaire, 1850 g
 Cryptocephalus nitidicollis
 Cryptocephalus nitidissimus Chujo, 1934 g
 Cryptocephalus nitidulus Fabricius, 1787 g
 Cryptocephalus nitidus (Linnaeus, 1758) g
 Cryptocephalus nitobei Chujo, 1934 g
 Cryptocephalus notatus Fabricius, 1787 i c g b
 Cryptocephalus nubigena Franz, 1982 g
 Cryptocephalus numidicus
 Cryptocephalus obsoletus Germar, 1824 i c g b
 Cryptocephalus ocellatus Drapiez, 1819 g
 Cryptocephalus ochraceus Fall, 1932
 Cryptocephalus ochroleucus Fairmaire, 1859 g
 Cryptocephalus octacosmus Bedel, 1891 g
 Cryptocephalus octoguttatus (Linnaeus, 1767) g
 Cryptocephalus octomaculatus Rossi, 1790 g
 Cryptocephalus octopunctatus (Scopoli, 1763) g
 Cryptocephalus ohnoi Kimoto, 1983 g
 Cryptocephalus optimus Schöller, 2002 i c g b
 Cryptocephalus oranensis
 Cryptocephalus ovatus Fleutiaux & Sallé, 1889 g
 Cryptocephalus paganensis
 Cryptocephalus pallidicinctus Fall, 1932 i c g b
 Cryptocephalus pallidocinctus
 Cryptocephalus pallifrons Gyllenhal, 1813 g
 Cryptocephalus paphlagonius
 Cryptocephalus parvulus Müller, 1776 g
 Cryptocephalus pasticus Suffrian, 1863 g
 Cryptocephalus pelleti
 Cryptocephalus perelegans Baly, 1873 g
 Cryptocephalus perrisi
 Cryptocephalus pexicollis Suffrian, 1847 g
 Cryptocephalus peyroni
 Cryptocephalus phaleratus
 Cryptocephalus piceoverticalis
 Cryptocephalus pini (Linnaeus, 1758) g
 Cryptocephalus pinicola Schaeffer, 1919
 Cryptocephalus pinicolus Schaeffer, 1920 i c g b
 Cryptocephalus planifrons
 Cryptocephalus plantaris
 Cryptocephalus podager Seidlitz, 1867 g
 Cryptocephalus politus Suffrian, 1853 g
 Cryptocephalus pominorum Burlini, 1956 g
 Cryptocephalus populi Suffrian, 1848 g
 Cryptocephalus praticola
 Cryptocephalus primarius Harold, 1872 g
 Cryptocephalus prusias
 Cryptocephalus pseudolusitanicus
 Cryptocephalus pseudomaccus White, 1968
 Cryptocephalus pseudoreitteri
 Cryptocephalus pseudosindonicus
 Cryptocephalus pubicollis Linell, 1898 i c g b
 Cryptocephalus pubiventris Schaeffer, 1920 i c g b
 Cryptocephalus pulchellus
 Cryptocephalus pullus
 Cryptocephalus pumilus Haldeman, 1849 i c g b
 Cryptocephalus punctatissimus
 Cryptocephalus puncticollis
 Cryptocephalus punctiger Paykull, 1799 g
 Cryptocephalus punctipes Say, 1824
 Cryptocephalus pusillus Fabricius, 1777 g
 Cryptocephalus pygmaeus Fabricius, 1792 g
 Cryptocephalus quadriguttatus
 Cryptocephalus quadripunctatus Olivier, 1808 g
 Cryptocephalus quadripustulatus Gyllenhal, 1813 g
 Cryptocephalus quadruplex Newman, 1841 i c g b
 Cryptocephalus quatuordecimmaculatus
 Cryptocephalus querceti Suffrian, 1848 g
 Cryptocephalus quercus Schaeffer, 1906 i c g b
 Cryptocephalus quinquepunctatus (Scopoli, 1763) g
 Cryptocephalus rabatensis
 Cryptocephalus ramburii Suffrian, 1847 g
 Cryptocephalus regalis Gebler, 1830 g
 Cryptocephalus reichei
 Cryptocephalus reitteri
 Cryptocephalus renatae
 Cryptocephalus richteri
 Cryptocephalus rubi
 Cryptocephalus rufilabris
 Cryptocephalus rufipes (Goeze, 1777) g
 Cryptocephalus rufofasciatus
 Cryptocephalus rugicollis Olivier, 1791 g
 Cryptocephalus rugulipennis
 Cryptocephalus ruri Chujo, 1934 g
 Cryptocephalus saintpierrei
 Cryptocephalus saliceti Zebe, 1855 g
 Cryptocephalus samniticus
 Cryptocephalus sanguinicollis Suffrian, 1852 i c g b
 Cryptocephalus sareptanus
 Cryptocephalus saucius Truqui, 1852 g
 Cryptocephalus sauteri Chujo, 1934 g
 Cryptocephalus scapularis Suffrian, 1848 g
 Cryptocephalus schaefferi Schrank, 1789 g
 Cryptocephalus schreibersii Suffrian, 1852 i c g b
 Cryptocephalus semicircularis Suffrian, 1863 g
 Cryptocephalus senegalensis
 Cryptocephalus sericeus
 Cryptocephalus sexmaculatus Olivier, 1791 g
 Cryptocephalus sexpunctatus (Linnaeus, 1758) g
 Cryptocephalus sexpustulatus (Villers, 1789) g
 Cryptocephalus signatifrons Suffrian, 1847 g
 Cryptocephalus simulans Schaeffer, 1906 i c g b
 Cryptocephalus sinaita
 Cryptocephalus sinuatus Harold, 1872 g
 Cryptocephalus snowi Schaeffer, 1934 i c g b
 Cryptocephalus solivagus
 Cryptocephalus solus Chujo, 1934 g
 Cryptocephalus spectator Weise, 1913 g
 Cryptocephalus spilothorax
 Cryptocephalus spurcus Leconte, 1858
 Cryptocephalus stragula Rossi, 1794 g
 Cryptocephalus striatulus Leconte, 1880
 Cryptocephalus strigosus Germar, 1824 g
 Cryptocephalus suffriani
 Cryptocephalus sulphureus Olivier, 1808 g
 Cryptocephalus sultani
 Cryptocephalus surdus
 Cryptocephalus swinhoei Bates, 1866 g
 Cryptocephalus taiwanus Chujo, 1934 g
 Cryptocephalus tappesi
 Cryptocephalus tardus Weise, 1888 g
 Cryptocephalus telueticus
 Cryptocephalus tetradecaspilotus Baly, 1837 g
 Cryptocephalus tetraspilus Suffrian, 1851 g
 Cryptocephalus texanus Schaeffer, 1933 i c g b
 Cryptocephalus therondi Franz, 1949 g
 Cryptocephalus tibialis Brisout de Barneville, 1866 g
 Cryptocephalus tinctus Leconte, 1880
 Cryptocephalus tramuntanae
 Cryptocephalus transiens Franz, 1949 g
 Cryptocephalus trapezicollis
 Cryptocephalus tricolor
 Cryptocephalus trimaculatus Rossi, 1790 g
 Cryptocephalus tristigma Charpentier, 1825 g
 Cryptocephalus triundulatus White, 1968
 Cryptocephalus trivittatus Olivier, 1808 i c g b
 Cryptocephalus trizonatus Suffrian, 1858
 Cryptocephalus tshorumae
 Cryptocephalus turcicus Suffrian, 1847 g
 Cryptocephalus umbonatus Schaeffer, 1906 i c g b
 Cryptocephalus undulatus
 Cryptocephalus vapidus White, 1968
 Cryptocephalus variceps
 Cryptocephalus variegatus Fabricius, 1782 g
 Cryptocephalus venustus Fabricius, 1787 i c g b
 Cryptocephalus vidali
 Cryptocephalus villosulus
 Cryptocephalus violaceus Laicharting, 1781 g
 Cryptocephalus virens
 Cryptocephalus virginiensis White, 1968
 Cryptocephalus vitraci Fleutiaux & Sallé, 1889 g
 Cryptocephalus vittatus
 Cryptocephalus volkovitshi
 Cryptocephalus wehnckei
 Cryptocephalus xanthocephalus Suffrian, 1863 g
 Cryptocephalus xanthus
 Cryptocephalus yangweii S.-H.Chen, 1942 g
 Cryptocephalus zambanellus Marseul, 1875 g
 Cryptocephalus zoiai Sassi, 2001 g

Data sources: i = ITIS, c = Catalogue of Life, g = GBIF, b = Bugguide.net

References

Cryptocephalus